Montagne Jeunesse, renamed "7th Heaven", is a beauty-product business based in Baglan Energy Park, South Wales, UK. The firm was established in 1985 by a vegetarian, Gregory Butcher. The company manufactures toiletry that are approved by the Vegetarian Society and the British Union for the Abolition of Vivisection (BUAV).

The company has had a Welsh presence since 1988, and has been located on the Baglan Energy Park site since November 2005, marketing and distributing cosmetic products such as face masks.

References

External links 
 

Cosmetics companies of the United Kingdom
Chemical companies established in 1985
Manufacturing companies of Wales
1985 establishments in Wales